John James Hamsher (born 14 January 1978) is an English footballer who played as a right back. He played in the Football League for Fulham.

Career
Hamsher started his career in 1994 when he joined the youth setup at Fulham. He made three substitute appearances for the Cottagers in 1996 before he was released in the summer of 1997. Following his release he signed for Conference side Rushden & Diamonds in August 1997.

References

External links

1970 births
Living people
English footballers
People from Lambeth
Fulham F.C. players
Rushden & Diamonds F.C. players
Dagenham & Redbridge F.C. players
Carshalton Athletic F.C. players
Stevenage F.C. players
Metropolitan Police F.C. players
Scunthorpe United F.C. players
Cove F.C. players
Chertsey Town F.C. players
Guildford City F.C. players
Banstead Athletic F.C. players
English Football League players
National League (English football) players
Association football defenders